= Harga (film) =

- Directed by: Leila Chaibi
- Produced by: Audimage
- Cinematography: Leila Chaibi
- Edited by: Leila Chaibi Fairouz Feki
- Music by: Intidhar Kammarti Hsin Ben Miloud
- Release date: 2010
- Running time: 27 minutes
- Countries: France; Tunisia

Harga (also known as "La Brûlure") is a 2010 documentary film.

The film has been shown at a Festival of World Films in Montreal in 2010 and at a Festival de la Citoyenneté in Tunis in 2011.

== Synopsis ==
Hichem has dreamt with "harga" since he was a child. One day he set forth on the sea towards Europe, on the grand forbidden voyage in a precarious open boat with 27 other Tunisians, some of whom were his friends. Hichem is the only one who has come back. Other Tunisians tell us why they want to leave their country: Poverty, unemployment, no hope for the future, trapped in a dead end. They are ready to do anything to improve their situation, and that includes risking their lives.
